The , commonly known in Japanese as , is a national trade union center.

Founding and history
Zenroren was founded on November 21, 1989.

Party affiliation
Zenroren is not affiliated to any political party, but is generally aligned with the Japan Communist Party.

Affiliated unions

Current affiliates
The following unions are affiliated:

There are also prefectural Federations in all 47 prefectures of Japan.

Former affiliates

Leadership

General Secretaries
1989: Kanemichi Kumagai
1998: Mitsuo Bannai
2006: Sakuji Daikoku
Hisashi Inoue
2017: Yukihiro Nomura
2020: Kurosawa Koichi

Presidents
1989: Matsumoto Michihiro
Takeshi Ooe
Mitsuru Mikami
Kanemichi Kumagai
Kobayashi Yoji
2006: Mitsuo Bannai
2008: Yoshikazu Odagawa
2020: Obata Masako

See also

 Labor unions in Japan

References

External links
  

National trade union centers of Japan
Trade unions established in 1989